Maki's keelback (Hebius miyajimae) is a small snake up to 60 cm in total length. It inhabits low montane environments in the central and northern part of Taiwan; it is considered a forest specialist. It is endemic to Taiwan. There is also an unverified record from Hainan, China. Amphiesma miyajimae is threatened in parts of its range through habitat degradation and road kills.

References

Hebius
Reptiles of Taiwan
Endemic fauna of Taiwan
Reptiles described in 1931